The Diwan-i-Khas (or "Hall of Private Audiences"), is located in the Lahore Fort in Lahore, Pakistan. It served as the place where the Mughal emperors received courtiers and state guests. 

In contrast to the Diwan-i-Aam, the Diwan-i-Khas served as a hall where the Mughal Emperor would attend to matters of the state. The hall was the site of elaborate pageantry, with processions of up to one hour long occurring before each audience session.

Gallery

See also
Diwan-i-Khas (Red Fort), Delhi

References

External links

Lahore Fort